Roots is the eleventh studio album by the French Rumba Catalana band Gipsy Kings, which was released in 2004 in Europe, USA, and Japan. Both the Europe and US release are identical and have 16 tracks while the Japanese version have two bonus tracks: "Canut Fandango" and "Mi Novia".

Track listing

Personnel

Paco Baliardo - guitar (1, 5, 7, 8, 10, 11, 14, 16), hand clapping (4, 16), flamenco guitar (5)
Diego Baliardo - hand clapping (5), guitar (8, 16), vocals (16)
Mikail Baliardo - cajon (4)
Tonino Baliardo - lead guitar (1, 4, 5, 6, 7, 8, 10, 11, 12, 13, 14, 16), guitar (15), hand clapping (16)
Cyro Baptista - percussion (1, 5, 6, 11, 13, 14, 16), washboard (7, 10), shaker (15)
Greg Cohen - double bass (1, 2, 4, 5, 6, 7, 8, 10, 11, 12, 13, 14, 15, 16), arco (2)
Garth Hudson - accordion (2, 16)
Bachir Mokari - derbouka (15)
Andre Reyes – guitar (1, 7, 13, 16), vocals (1, 12, 13, 16), hand clapping (4, 5), backing vocals (6, 10)
François "Canut" Reyes - guitar (1), lead vocal (2, 7, 13)
Georges "Baule" Reyes - 
Nicholas Reyes – lead vocal (1, 5, 6, 10, 12), hand clapping (4, 5), guitar (5, 6, 9, 12), vocal (9)
Pablo (Paul) Reyes - guitar (1, 5, 7, 10, 15, 16), hand clapping (5)
Patchai Reyes - vocals (3, 15, 16), guitar (3, 15)
Yakouba Sissoko - kora (14)
Titi - hand clapping (16)

References

Gipsy Kings albums
Nonesuch Records albums
2004 albums
Albums produced by Craig Street